Bimberi Peak or Mount Bimberi with an elevation of  located within the Brindabella Ranges is the highest mountain in the Australian Capital Territory (ACT). It is located on the border between New South Wales (NSW) and the ACT, the NSW portion in Kosciuszko National Park and the ACT portion in Namadgi National Park. It is accessible by bush walking trails and requires no specialised climbing skills, although there is no marked trail to the very summit.

Routes 

Following the ridge up is the easiest way to summit, although taking a compass bearing is useful. There is a large surveyors mark at the summit.

Vegetation and weather

The top of Bimberi Peak is above the tree line. Strong winds blow across the summit. During winter Bimberi is generally covered in snow.

See also

List of mountains of Australia
List of mountains in the Australian Capital Territory

References

Mountains of the Australian Capital Territory
Mountains of New South Wales
Borders of New South Wales
Borders of the Australian Capital Territory
Brindabella Ranges